Euthalia confucius  is a butterfly of the family Nymphalidae (Limenitidinae). It is found in Burma, Tibet, China and Vietnam (subspecies gibbsi Monastyrskii & Devyatkin, 2003). Subspecies E. c. sadona Tytler, 1940 is described from Yunnan.

References

Butterflies described in 1850
confucius